The year 1909 was marked, in science fiction, by the following events.

Births and deaths

Births 
 February 25 : Edgar Pangborn, American writer (died 1976)

Deaths

Events

Awards 
The main science-fiction Awards known at the present time did not exist at this time.

Literary releases

Novels 
  Sternentau. Die Pflanze vom Neptunmond, novel by Kurd Laßwitz.

Stories collections

Short stories 
 The Machine Stops, short story by Edward Morgan Forster.

Comics

Audiovisual outputs

Movies

See also 
 1909 in science
 1908 in science fiction
 1910 in science fiction

References

science-fiction
Science fiction by year